Aurang Zeb (born 10 January 1923) is a Pakistani sprinter. He competed in the men's 400 metres at the 1952 Summer Olympics.

References

External links

1923 births
Possibly living people
Athletes (track and field) at the 1952 Summer Olympics
Pakistani male sprinters
Olympic athletes of Pakistan
Place of birth missing (living people)